Mathew James Burrows is an American intelligence and strategic foresight expert and author.

He is the leading author of several National Intelligence Council’s Global Trends editions, an unclassified assessment of long term key trends, threats and uncertainties used to prepare incoming U.S. Presidents at the beginning of a new Administration, that are widely read and commented upon : "Global Trends 2020: Mapping the Global Future" (December 2004), "Global Trends 2025: A Transformed World" (November 2008) and "Global Trends 2030: Alternative Worlds" (December 2012).

Biography 
Born in Ohio (August 31, 1953), Burrows earned a Bachelor of Arts degree in American and European History from the Wesleyan University (Connecticut), as well as a Master of Arts degree and PhD in History from the University of Cambridge, United Kingdom.

He lives in Washington, D.C.

Career 
He spent almost 25 years with the Central Intelligence Agency (CIA), including being assigned as special assistant to the US UN Ambassador Richard Holbrooke (1999-2001) and detailed to the National Intelligence Council (NIC) during the last decade of his career. After leaving the NIC, he joined the Atlantic Council, a non-partisan public policy think tank based in Washington, D.C, as Director of the Foresight, Strategy, and Risks Initiative.

At the National Intelligence Council, he established the Long Range Analysis Unit, currently called Strategic Futures Group (2005). While his Global Trends reports were praised as well written and very informative, as well as for the use of scenarios, some have argued that the last one written by Burrows retained a US-centric character, especially by downplaying the issues of climate change and of the mounting trend of conflicts based on religious or cultural identity.

He has been a long-standing partner of the European Strategy and Policy Analysis System (ESPAS), which is the European institutions' foresight network, since its inception in 2011 and the co-publication by the NIC and the European Union’s Institute for Security Studies (EUISS) of "Global Governance 2025: At a Critical Juncture", the first unclassified report by the National Intelligence Council developed with a non-US organization.

He has provided commentaries on the lack of the US Administration's strategic preparedness for global disasters, such as the coronavirus pandemic.

He is co-director with Christopher Preble of the New American Engagement Initiative, launched by the Atlantic Council in February 2020 and buoyed by a five-year, $4.5 million grant from the Charles Koch Institute, which aims to challenge prevailing assumptions governing US foreign policy. In March 2021, a brief published by Burrows and Emma Ashford in the New American Engagement Initiative’s Reality Checks series regarding United States’ approach to Russia caused a public battle.

Publications 
After leaving the NIC in 2013, he wrote "The Future, Declassified: Megatrends That Will Undo the World Unless We Take Action", which features both non-fiction and fiction chapters (2014). The book "Global System on the Brink: Pathways toward a New Normal" (2016), which he co-authored with Alexander Dynkin, President of the  Russian Institute of World Economy and International Relations (IMEMO), was included in the University of Pennsylvania's list of "Best Policy studies and reports published by a Think Tank" in 2016.

He continues to publish reports on global issues under his current position at the Atlantic Council, such as "Global Risks 2035: The Search for a New Normal" and its update "Decline or New Renaissance" or on the implications of the COVID19 pandemic.

His academic contributions focus on the use of strategic foresight methodologies in government.

References

External links 
 Central Intelligence Agency
 National Intelligence Council
 Atlantic Council
 Council of Foreign Relations

Atlantic Council
1953 births
Living people